Lyon Turin Ferroviaire (LTF), a subsidiary of Réseau Ferré de France (RFF) and Rete Ferroviaria Italiana (RFI), was the early developer of the joint French-Italian part of the future rail link between Lyon and Turin. It has now been replaced in that role by Tunnel Euralpin Lyon Turin (TELT), with the same staff and leadership.

The critical part of this planned line is the  Mont d'Ambin Base Tunnel between Saint-Jean-de-Maurienne in France and the Susa Valley in Italy.

In November 2007, the European Commission granted €671.8 million (up to 30% of its total value) to the transborder section of the Lyon-Turin link through its multiannual TEN-T program (2007-2013).

This contribution of the EU lies within the global financing of €2.1 billion in favor of the transborder section of the Lyon-Turin for 2007-2013 period.
Italy and France bring the major part of these financing.

See also 
NRLA
Brenner Base Tunnel
TAV
TGV
Turin–Lyon high-speed railway

References

External links 

Long-term TGV plans Railway Gazette International, 2008-06-02

Lyon-Turin
Lyon-Turin
Ferrovie dello Stato Italiane
Rail transport in Lyon
Transport in Turin
Proposed railway lines in France
Railway companies of France
International railway lines